In enzymology, an acetylspermidine deacetylase is an enzyme that catalyzes the chemical reaction

N8-acetylspermidine + H2O  acetate + spermidine

Thus, the two substrates of this enzyme are N8-acetylspermidine and H2O, whereas its two products are acetate and spermidine.

This enzyme belongs to the family of hydrolases, those acting on carbon-nitrogen bonds other than peptide bonds, specifically in linear amides.  The systematic name of this enzyme class is N8-acetylspermidine amidohydrolase. Other names in common use include N8-monoacetylspermidine deacetylase, N8-acetylspermidine deacetylase, N-acetylspermidine deacetylase, N1-acetylspermidine amidohydrolase (incorrect), and 8-N-acetylspermidine amidohydrolase.

References

 
 
 

EC 3.5.1
Enzymes of unknown structure